The Medium Tank T20,  Medium Tank T22 and Medium Tank T23 were medium tank designs developed by the United States during the Second World War, to be the successor to the M4 Sherman. 

On the basis that the M4 was becoming obsolete, the Ordnance Department requested the 76mm gunned T23E3 and T20E3 be standardized as the M27 and M27B1 in July 1943. However, the request was rejected and neither design was ever mass-produced. The Army did not consider it necessary to interrupt M4 production for a vehicle for which they did not perceive a requirement and the introduction of the 76 mm gun to the tank force was opposed by the Armored Ground Force.

Successive evolution of the basic design culminated in the M26 Pershing.

Design and development
Almost immediately after the M4 Sherman was standardized, the US Ordnance Department started work on a successor. The Ordnance Department had already been working on a heavily armored infantry tank design for the British, using M4 parts. The new project was started on the 25 May 1942, it was originally designated M4X.

After a wooden mockup produced by Fisher, Ordnance (in agreement with Armored Force Board) set out three pilot models to be built with different combinations of armament but interchangeable turrets. All would use the Ford GAN V-8 engine driving Hydra-matic transmission through a torque converter. The T20 would have the 76mm gun, the T20E1 the automatic 75mm and the T20E2 a 3-inch gun. T20 and T20E1 would be fitted with horizontal volute spring suspension (HVSS) but the T20E2 would have had torsion bar suspension.

Starting with the T20, the Ordnance Department initially developed three series of improved medium tank prototypes, the T20, T22, and T23. The main differences between the T20, T22 and T23 lay in the choice of transmission. The T20 used a torque converter fluid drive, the T22 a 5-speed mechanical drive similar to the M4 drive, and the T23 used an electric drive. All moved the transmission to the rear of the vehicle eliminating the need for a driveshaft running the length of the vehicle. The driveshaft used in the M3 and M4 vehicles forced the turret to be mounted higher increasing the vehicle height.

T20 series

All the T20 models used the Ford GAN V8 engine with Torqmatic torque converter transmission with rear drive sprocket. The hull was all-welded construction and the turrets cast.  
T20
 76 mm gun M1 and horizontal volute spring suspension. Built by Fisher and completed in June 1943.
T20E1
Planned to be 75 mm automatic gun and horizontal volute spring suspension but cancelled and turret used on the T22E1.
T20E2
Intended to have 3 inch gun and torsion bar suspension but completed by Fisher with 76mm gun and designated T20E3.
T20E3
 76 mm gun and torsion bar suspension

The T20 and T20E3 were tested but the transmission leaked and overheated. Any further work on them was stopped at end of 1944.

T22 series

Work on T22 started in October 1942 when Chrysler were contracted to build pilot tanks that were identical to the T20 including the Ford GAN V8 except for using the M4 Sherman transmission though rear wheel drive rather than positioned in the front of the Sherman's. Both vehicles were built by June 1943 but as with the T20 there were transmission issues and work on the T22 was cancelled in December 1944.

T22
 76 mm gun and horizontal volute spring suspension
T22E1
First T22 pilot refitted with the turret built by United Shoe Machinery Corporation for the cancelled T20E1. 75 mm automatic gun and horizontal volute spring suspension The gun was a 75mm M3 on mount M34 which was fed by a hydraulic loader from two magazines – one with AP shells and the other with HE.  
T22E3
Equivalent of the T20 with 3-inch gun; cancelled during design stage.

There was only one T22 constructed. The T22E1 was the T22 pilot vehicle re-equipped with the turret originally built for the T20E1. The 75 mm automatic gun was tested in this installation and gave a maximum rate of fire of 20 rounds a minute, but was abandoned in December 1944 on the basis that it was unreliable and larger calibre guns were now the priority.

T23 series

The T23 design was to be similar to the T22 but using an General Electric supplied electric transmission with M4 tracks and VVS suspension.
As with T20 and T22, three pilot models were ordered from Detroit Arsenal with different armament T23 with 76mm, T23E1 with automatic 75mm and T23E2 with 3-inch gun. The 75mm and 3-inch designs were cancelled before completion but the first T23 was completed and entered trials before the T20 or T22 designs; the second was ready by March 1943.  The T23 was found to be highly maneuverable.

T23
76 mm gun and vertical volute suspension Electric transmission.
T23E1 
automatic 75mm. Cancelled.
T23E2
3-inch gun. Cancelled
T23E3
 76 mm gun and torsion bar suspension

The design was classified "limited procurement" in May 1943 and 250 T23s were ordered; these were built between November 1943 and December 1944 although the design was never standardized or issued to front line units.  Production models featured the T80 gun mount and M1A1 76mm gun. The turret would later be used in modified form for 76mm M4 variants. The T23 was not adopted for service partly because of its untried transmission system and partly because the design had poor weight distribution and excessive ground pressure. In an attempt to rectify this, two further variants were ordered, the T23E3 with torsion bar suspension and the T23E4 with horizontal volute suspension. The T23E4 was cancelled before the design was completed, but the T23E3 prototype was completed and the torsion bar suspension was found to have reduced the ground pressure by 20% compared to the T23.

T21 Light Tank
In a related development the T21 was proposed as a replacement for the M3 and M5 series light tanks. It was to have been based on the hull and turret design of the T20 but with a maximum armor thickness of  it would weigh only  been armed with the 76 mm gun, used either a torsion bar or use the vertical volute spring suspension of the M7 Medium Tank (originally known as T7 Light Tank). 

Ultimately, the T21 concept was superseded by the T24 program, which was standardized as the M24 Chaffee.

Further development
With standardization of the M27 rejected, the Ordnance Department continued designing improved tanks, this time armed with 90 mm guns. The immediate result of this line of development was the T25 series – essentially a slightly larger version of the T23 – and then the bigger, better protected T26. The T26 further evolved into the T26E3, and was ultimately standardized as the M26 Pershing and accepted into service in 1944.

See also
 M-numbers
 G-numbers (G183)

References

Sources

 TM 9-734 (1944)
 TM 9-1734 (1944)
 SNL G183

External links

 World War II Vehicles

World War II medium tanks
Medium tanks of the United States
World War II tanks of the United States
Abandoned military projects of the United States
Trial and research tanks of the United States